Rufino Serafín Bejérez Pereira das Neves (13 July 1952 – 29 October 2022) was a Uruguayan farmer and politician. A member of the National Party, he served as intendant of Cerro Largo from 1998 to 1999.

Bejérez died on 29 October 2022, at the age of 70.

References

1952 births
2022 deaths
Intendants of Cerro Largo Department
National Party (Uruguay) politicians
People from Melo, Uruguay